In biology, the SECIS element (SECIS: selenocysteine insertion sequence) is an RNA element around 60 nucleotides in length that adopts a stem-loop structure. This structural motif (pattern of nucleotides) directs the cell to translate UGA codons as selenocysteines (UGA is normally a stop codon). SECIS elements are thus a fundamental aspect of messenger RNAs encoding selenoproteins, proteins that include one or more selenocysteine residues.

In bacteria the SECIS element appears soon after the UGA codon it affects. In archaea and eukaryotes, it occurs in the 3' UTR of an mRNA, and can cause multiple UGA codons within the mRNA to code for selenocysteine. One archaeal SECIS element, in Methanococcus, is located in the 5' UTR.

The SECIS element appears defined by sequence characteristics, i.e. particular nucleotides tend to be at particular positions in it, and a characteristic secondary structure. The secondary structure is the result of base-pairing of complementary RNA nucleotides, and causes a hairpin-like structure. The eukaryotic SECIS element includes non-canonical A-G base pairs, which are uncommon in nature, but are critically important for correct SECIS element function. Although the eukaryotic, archaeal and bacterial SECIS elements each share a general hairpin structure, they are not alignable, e.g. an alignment-based scheme to recognize eukaryotic SECIS elements will not be able to recognize archaeal SECIS elements. However, in Lokiarcheota, SECIS elements are more similar to eukaryotic elements.

In bioinformatics, several computer programs have been created that search for SECIS elements within a genome sequence, based on the sequence and secondary structure characteristics of SECIS elements. These programs have been used in searches for novel selenoproteins.

Species distribution
The SECIS element is found in a wide variety of organisms from all three domains of life (including their viruses).

References

External links 
 
 
 
 
 

Gene expression
Cis-regulatory RNA elements